A gubernatorial election was held on 10 April 1983 to elect the Governor of Hokkaido Prefecture.

Candidates
Takahiro Yokomichi - member of the House of Representatives, age 42.
 - former Vice-Governor of Hokkaido, age 55.
 - lawyer, age 54.

Results

References

Hokkaido gubernational elections
1983 elections in Japan